Adriana Rebeca Marmolejo Vargas (born March 5, 1982) is a 3-time Olympic and national record-holding swimmer from Mexico. She swam at the 2000, 2004 and 2008 Olympics, making her the first Mexican woman to swim at 3 Olympic Games. She has held the Mexican Records in the 50, 100 and 200 breaststrokes since 1998.

In January 2009, Marmolejo became an assistant coach with the men's and women's swimming teams at Arizona State University.  After coaching in Phoenix, and later at Northwestern University, Marmolejo joined the coaching staff at the University of Chicago In October 2010.

Family
Adriana father's, Ricardo, and her brother Pablo have both been members of Mexico's national swimming team. Ricardo swam at the 1968 and 1972 Summer Olympics. Pablo swam at the 2006 Central American and Caribbean Games (alongside Adriana) and at the 2007 World Championships. At the 2009 FINA World Championships in Rome, Italy Pablo set the Mexico National Record in the 100 meter butterfly. A record once held father, Ricardo. In June 2011, Adriana married Kyle Schack of Huntington Woods, Michigan in Cancún, Quintana Roo, Mexico.  She changed her name to Adriana Schack.

Swimming
Adriana has won 75 Mexican National titles over the course of her swimming career.

She swam collegiately for the USA's Texas A&M University.

On August 10, 1998, at the 1998 Central American and Caribbean Games in Maracaibo, Venezuela, she set the Games Record in the women's 200m Breaststroke (2:37.12). She also bettered the mark at the 2006 CACs.

At the 2008 Olympics, Marmolejo swam a lifetime best time and bettered her Mexican Record in the 100 and 200m breaststroke (1:10.73 and 2:28.10).

References

External links

1982 births
Living people
Mexican female swimmers
Female breaststroke swimmers
Arizona State Sun Devils swimming coaches
Northwestern University staff
Swimmers at the 1999 Pan American Games
Swimmers at the 2000 Summer Olympics
Swimmers at the 2003 Pan American Games
Swimmers at the 2004 Summer Olympics
Swimmers at the 2007 Pan American Games
Swimmers at the 2008 Summer Olympics
Texas A&M Aggies women's swimmers
Chicago Maroons coaches
Olympic swimmers of Mexico
Swimmers from Mexico City
Pan American Games bronze medalists for Mexico
Pan American Games medalists in swimming
Central American and Caribbean Games gold medalists for Mexico
Central American and Caribbean Games silver medalists for Mexico
Competitors at the 2006 Central American and Caribbean Games
Central American and Caribbean Games medalists in swimming
Medalists at the 2003 Pan American Games
21st-century American women